Malice in Wonderland is a 1985 American  made-for-television biographical film based on the 1972 novel Hedda and Louella: A Dual Biography of Hedda Hopper and Louella Parsons by George Eells.  Starring Elizabeth Taylor and Jane Alexander, it tells the based-on-real-life stories of powerful Hollywood gossip columnists Hedda Hopper and Louella Parsons, once friends and later rivals. The film premiered on CBS on 12 May 1985. The film was a ratings success gaining an 18.3 rating equaling to 15,536,700 households tuning in its original air date.

Cast
 Elizabeth Taylor as Louella Parsons
 Jane Alexander as Hedda Hopper
 Richard Dysart as Louis B. Mayer
 Joyce Van Patten as Dema Harshbarger
 Jon Cypher as Dr. Harry 'Docky' Martin
 Leslie Ackerman as Harriet Parsons
 Bonnie Bartlett as Ida Koverman
 Thomas Byrd as William Hopper
 Joel Colodner as Andy Kenderson
 Rick Lenz as Iceman
 Mary McCusker as Dot 
 John Pleshette as Tommy Gallep
 Eric Purcell as Orson Welles
 Tim Robbins as Joseph Cotten
 Mark L. Taylor as Howard Strickling
 Nancy Travis as Ann
 B.J. Ward as June
 Vernon Weddle as Sam Goldwyn
 Allen Williams as Joel
 Theodore Wilson as Collins
 Jason Wingreen as Jack L. Warner
 Helen Baron as Ellen
 Thomas Bellin as Hotel Clerk
 Denise Crosby as Carole Lombard
 Robert Darnell as Heiner
 Christine Dickinson as Betty
 Douglas Emerson as Young Bill Harper
 Edith Fields as Mrs. Washburn
 Lyla Graham as Mrs. Clayton
 Anne Haney as Dema's Secretary
 Mindi Iden as Starlet
 Leigh Kavanaugh as 2nd Journalist
 Amelia Laurenson as Elizabeth Arden
 Galen Thompson as Hal
 Jan Tříska as Mike Romanoff
 Keith Walker as Albert
 Gary Wayne as Clark Gable
 Noni White as 1st Journalist
 Craig Richard Nelson as Radio Producer

Crew
 Director as Gus Trikonis
 Producer as Jay Benson
 Music as Charles Bernstein
 Cinematographer as Philip H. Lathrop
 Film Editing as Allan Jacobs
 Production Designer as John D. Jefferies Sr.
 Costume designer as Nolan Miller

Home media
Malice in Wonderland was released on Region 1 DVD on June 28, 2004 with a running time of 94 minutes.

External links
 

1985 films
1980s historical comedy-drama films
1985 television films
American biographical films
American comedy-drama television films
American historical comedy-drama films
CBS network films
Films set in the 20th century
Biographical films about journalists
Films directed by Gus Trikonis
1980s English-language films
1980s American films